Teshan is a 2016 Indian Punjabi-language romantic comedy film directed by Sukhbir Singh, written by Prince KJ Singh and starring Happy Raikoti and Diljott in lead roles, with Yograj Singh, Shavinder Mahal, Karamjit Anmol, Prince KJ Singh in supporting roles in the film. The Film is about the relations and simplicity of the village people, shown through different perspectives. The shooting commenced in March 2016 and release on 23 September 2016.

Plot
Happy Raikoti playing a boy who comes from backward village. Diljot is playing an urban girl, who despite being modern understands relationship values. It is a youth based film.

Cast

 Happy Raikoti as Teshan  
 Diljott as Jinni
 Yograj Singh
 Shivendra Mahal
 Karamjit Anmol

References

External links
 Teshan trailer
 

2016 films
Punjabi-language Indian films
2010s Punjabi-language films
Films scored by Laddi Gill